Colour Trip is the debut studio album by American shoegaze band Ringo Deathstarr. It was released February 14, 2011 in the UK on Club AC30, then licensed to Sonic Unyon for release in North America, and Vinyl Junkie Recordings for release in Japan.

Track listing

References

2011 debut albums
Ringo Deathstarr albums
Sonic Unyon Records albums